Whitehorn Cove is an unincorporated community and census-designated place (CDP) in Wagoner County, Oklahoma, United States. It was first listed as a CDP prior to the 2020 census.

The CDP is in eastern Wagoner County, on the west shore of Fort Gibson Lake, a large reservoir on the Neosho River. The CDP is bordered by Rocky Point to the north and Toppers and Taylor Ferry to the south. The CDP's southern border is the centerline of North Bay, an arm of Fort Gibson Lake.

Demographics

References 

Census-designated places in Wagoner County, Oklahoma
Census-designated places in Oklahoma